In Greek mythology, Toxaechmes (Ancient Greek: Τοξαίχμην) was the "stalwart" Achaean warrior who participated in the Trojan War.

Mythology 
Toxaechmes was a comrade of Philoctetes who was killed by the Trojan hero Aeneas during the siege of Troy.
Wroth for his friend, a stone Aeneas hurled, and Philoctetes' stalwart comrade slew, Toxaechmes; for he shattered his head and crushed helmet and skull-bones; and his noble heart was stilled.

Notes

References 

 Quintus Smyrnaeus, The Fall of Troy translated by Way. A. S. Loeb Classical Library Volume 19. London: William Heinemann, 1913. Online version at theoi.com
 Quintus Smyrnaeus, The Fall of Troy. Arthur S. Way. London: William Heinemann; New York: G.P. Putnam's Sons. 1913. Greek text available at the Perseus Digital Library.

Achaeans (Homer)